USLA may refer to:
 Unitatea Specială de Luptă Antiteroristă, a Romanian special forces unit, now the Brigada Antiteroristă
 United States Lifesaving Association
 United States of Latin Africa
 Ural State Law Academy